The women's 70 kg judo competition at the 2012 Summer Paralympics was held on 1 September at ExCeL London.

Results

Repechage

References

External links
 

W70
Judo at the Summer Paralympics Women's Middleweight
Paralympics W70